Frank Tachau (19 October 1929, Braunschweig, Germany – 23 July 2010, Sykesville, USA) was an American scholar of German descent.  He is credited with raising the study of the Middle East to a new level, and was a lecturer and professor at a number of universities, most notably the University of Illinois.

Early life and education 
Frank Tachau was born in Baunschweig into a Jewish family.  His father was Paul Tachau and his mother Ilse Tachau.  Some members of the family were rabbis involved in German politics.  The family moved to the United States in 1936, eventually settling on Chicago's South Side.  Tachau graduated from the Hyde Park Academy High School.  He graduated with a BSc and eventually obtained an MSc in political sciences from the University of Chicago.  He received his Ph.D in international relations from the same university in 1958.  His dissertation focused on the "Diplomacy on the Turkish Straits between 1936 and 1942".

Academic career 
His early academic career led him to Purdue and Rutgers universities.  From September 1963 to June 1964 he was awarded a Fulbright Fellowship at the University of Ankara.  He was called to the University of Illinois in Chicago in 1968.  There he stayed for the remainder of his career, where on two occasions he acted as chairmen of the political science department.  He retired from his full-time professorship in 1996 but continued to lecture until 2010.

Research 
He is credited with raising research on the Middle East from a regional focus into a broader comparative field.  He conducted extensive research on the politics in Turkey and the Ottoman Empire; was appointed a visiting professor to several Turkish universities; and mastered both modern Turkish and Ottoman Turkish.  In his later years, he conducted research on Israeli politics—the interviews he conducted with elected members of the Israeli Parliament (Knesset) inspired several scholars.  He played a considerable role in giving the University of Illinois an important international reputation.

Personal life 
Frank Tachau was married and the father of five children. He died on the 23 July 2010.

References 

1929 births
2010 deaths
Academics from Chicago
University of Illinois faculty
University of Chicago alumni